Aytekin Mindan (born March 31, 1981) is a Turkish former swimmer, who specialized in freestyle events. He held a Turkish record of 1:50.40 in the 200 m freestyle, until it was matched by Kemal Arda Gurdal in 2012.  He studied at Istanbul Bilgi University.

Mindan made his official debut at the 2000 Summer Olympics in Sydney. He failed to advance into the succeeding rounds in any of his individual events, finishing forty-second in the 200 m freestyle (1:54.86), and thirty-ninth in the 400 m freestyle (4:01.46).

At the 2004 Summer Olympics in Athens, Mindan maintained his program by qualifying for two swimming events. He cleared FINA B-standard entry times of 1:51.14 (200 m freestyle) and 4:00.41 (400 m freestyle) from the Turkish Open Senior Championships in Izmir. On the first day of the Games, Zolezzi placed forty-first in the 400 m freestyle. Swimming in heat two, Mindan rounded out the field of seven swimmers to last place by a 10.33-second margin behind winner Giancarlo Zolezzi in 4:06.85. In his second event, 200 m freestyle, Mindan fell again to last place in heat four and fifty-second overall by 1.84 seconds behind Philippines' Miguel Molina with a time of 1:55.65.

References

1981 births
Living people
Turkish male freestyle swimmers
Olympic swimmers of Turkey
Swimmers at the 2000 Summer Olympics
Swimmers at the 2004 Summer Olympics
Istanbul Bilgi University alumni